The 1986 London Marathon was the sixth running of the annual marathon race in London, United Kingdom, which took place on Sunday, 20 April. The elite men's race was won by Japan's Toshihiko Seko in a time of 2:10:02 hours and the women's race was won by Norway's Grete Waitz in 2:24:54.

In the wheelchair races, Irish athletes Gerry O'Rourke (2:26:38) and Kay McShane (2:47:12) won the men's and women's divisions, respectively.

Around 80,000 people applied to enter the race, of which 25,566 had their applications accepted and 19,261 started the race. A total of 18,067 runners finished the race.

Results

Men

Women

Wheelchair men

Wheelchair women

References

Results
Results. Association of Road Racing Statisticians. Retrieved 2020-04-24.

External links

Official website

1986
London Marathon
Marathon
London Marathon